Euclasta amseli is a moth in the family Crambidae. It was described by Popescu-Gorj and Constantinescu in 1973. It is found in China.

References

Moths described in 1973
Pyraustinae